Dreamcatcher is the sixth studio album by hard rock band Last Autumn's Dream released by Marquee Avalon in Japan on December 24, 2008 and under Escape Music  label for European market on January 26, 2009.

Track listing
 "Welcome (Intro)"
 "One By One"
 "Hold On To My Heart"
 "Frozen Flower"
 "Silent Dream"
 "Alarm"
 "Never Faraway"
 "Your Kind Of Loving"
 "The Last To Know"
 "When Love Strikes Down"
 "Who Needs Love?"
 "Me & You"
 "When My Love Has Left Your Heart"
 "Hello, Hello, Hello" (Bonus Track for Japan)

Additional information
"Hello, Hello, Hello" is a cover of a song released originally by New England on their 1978 album New England.

Personnel
 Mikael Erlandsson - lead vocals and keyboards
 Andy Malecek - guitar
 Marcel Jacob − bass
 Jamie Borger − drums

Guest Musicians
 Sayit Dölen (Enrique Iglesias) - additional Guitars in Alarm
 Martin Kronlund (DogFace, Gypsy Rose, White Wolf) - additional Guitars

External links 
 LAD Myspace Page
 LAD Facebook official fan page 
 Marcel Jacob's official site
 
 Album review made by RockReport
 Escape Music label's Release album page

References 
LAD bio and Released info in Japan
Review made by Brian from RevelationZ magazine

Last Autumn's Dream albums
2009 albums

it:Last Autumn's Dream
zh:悲秋賦樂團